The Women's 10 metre air rifle was part of the Shooting at the 2018 Commonwealth Games program. The competition was held on 9 April 2018 at Belmont Shooting Centre in Brisbane. Martina Veloso won the gold medal, which was Singapore's first gold at the 2018 Commonwealth Games.

Results

Qualification

Finals

References

External links
 

Shooting at the 2018 Commonwealth Games
Comm